Hoplodoris bramale is a species of sea slug, a dorid nudibranch, a marine gastropod mollusc in the family Discodorididae''.

Distribution
This species is recorded from the eastern Pacific coast of Costa Rica.

References

Discodorididae
Gastropods described in 2003